The superfamily Apoidea is a major group within the Hymenoptera, which includes two traditionally recognized lineages, the "sphecoid" wasps, and the bees. Molecular phylogeny demonstrates that the bees arose from within the traditional "Crabronidae", so that grouping is paraphyletic, and this has led to a reclassification to produce monophyletic families.

Nomenclature 
Bees appear in recent classifications to be a specialized lineage of "crabronid" wasps that switched to the use of pollen and nectar as larval food, rather than insect prey; this makes the traditional "Crabronidae" a paraphyletic group. Accordingly, bees and sphecoids are now all grouped together in a single superfamily, and the older available name is "Apoidea" rather than "Sphecoidea" (which, like Spheciformes, has been used in the past, but also defined a paraphyletic group and has been abandoned).

As bees (not including their wasp ancestors) are still considered a monophyletic group, they are given a grouping between superfamily and family to unify all bees, Anthophila.

Phylogeny

This phylogenetic tree is based on Sann et al., 2018, which used phylogenomics to demonstrate that both the bees (Anthophila) and the Sphecidae arose from within the former "Crabronidae," which is therefore paraphyletic, and which they suggested should be split into several families; the former family Heterogynaidae nests within the Bembicidae, as defined by these authors. These findings differ in several details from studies published by two other sets of authors in 2017, though all three studies demonstrate a paraphyletic "Crabronidae."

References

Further reading
 
 Michener, C.D. (2000). The Bees of the World. Johns Hopkins University Press.

External links

 All Living Things Images, identification guides, and maps of Apoidea.
 Solitary Bees Popular introduction to the Hymenoptera Apoidea.
  Fiori e Api d'Albore and Intoppa Flower visiting bees in Europe pdf. In Italian but excellent table with Latin names.
 Native Bees of North America

 
Apocrita superfamilies